Microsoft Reader is a discontinued Microsoft application for reading e-books, first released in August 2000, that used its own .LIT format. It was available for Windows computers and Pocket PC PDAs. The name was also used later for an unrelated application for reading PDF and XPS files, first released with Windows 8 - this app was discontinued in 2018.

E-book Reader

The e-book reader was available for download from Microsoft as a free application for computers running Windows and on PDAs running Pocket PC, where it has been built into the ROM since Windows CE 3.0. Microsoft Reader was compatible with Windows Mobile, but was not supported on newer Windows Phone 7 devices.

Microsoft Reader displays books in the .LIT (shortened from "literature") format, an extension of the Microsoft Compressed HTML Help format to include DRM. These e-books can be purchased and downloaded from online stores.

The notable features of Microsoft Reader are ClearType for increased readability on small screens, highlighting and doodling designed for quick note-taking, text notes, and searching. The PC version also has an optional plug-in for text-to-speech, enabling books to be read out loud.

Companies such as Barnes & Noble and Amazon.com partnered with Microsoft to provide books in the format when released in 2000.

In August 2011, Microsoft announced they were discontinuing both Microsoft Reader and the use of the .lit format for ebooks at the end of August 2012, and ending sales of the format on November 8, 2011.

Compatibility

Copy protection 
Books accessible by Reader can be protected, or unprotected, only allowing access to protected books if the user has activated the software. This can be accomplished by registering using their Passport account. Only six Reader installations can be activated per account, after which, Microsoft requires the user to request further activations.

Creating .LIT files
Read in Microsoft Reader is an add-on, available from Microsoft, that can be used with Microsoft Word (versions 2000, 2002 and 2003) to create .LIT extension e-books. This software is not fully compatible with Office 2007.

Version history

Desktop

Pocket PC

Read in Microsoft Reader

Software Development Kit

Text to Speech

Third party
Notable third-party apps and tools to convert and read MS .LIT format on various devices include:
Calibre; an open source e-book library manager that runs on many environments; it can convert .LIT format files
Lexcycle Stanza (discontinued); a freeware program for reading eBooks; can read .LIT format, supports iOS.

Document viewer
In 2012, Microsoft released a Microsoft Reader Metro-style app with Windows 8 for reading documents in PDF, XPS and TIFF formats. Reader was included in Windows 8.1 and was a free download from the Windows Store for Windows 10. Support for Windows 10 Mobile ended in 2016 in favor of opening PDF documents within Microsoft Edge browser. Microsoft discontinued the application in February 2018, as PDF reading functionality was moved to Edge on desktops as well.

References

Reader
Pocket PC software
Electronic publishing
Media readers
Ebooks